is a town located in Haibara District, Shizuoka Prefecture, Japan. ,  the town had an estimated population of 6,731 in 2895 households  and a population density of 13.4 persons per km².

Geography
Kawanehon is located in north-central Shizuoka, along the upper reaches of the Ōi River, with approximately 90% of the town area covered in forest and mountains. It is bordered to the north by the Japanese Alps, with peaks ranging to 2400 meters. Forests range from Siebold's Beech at lower elevations to Siberian Dwarf Pine at higher altitudes, and wildlife include wild boar and kamoshika. The area enjoys a temperate maritime climate with hot, humid summers and mild, cool winters.

Surrounding municipalities
Shizuoka Prefecture
Aoi-ku, Shizuoka city
Tenryū-ku, Hamamatsu
Shimada
Nagano Prefecture
Iida

Climate
The town has a climate characterized by hot and humid summers, and relatively mild winters (Köppen climate classification Cfa).

Demographics
Per Japanese census data, the population of Kawanehon has declined by roughly two-thirds over the past 80 years.

History
Kawanehon is on the border between the former provinces of Suruga and Tōtōmi, and was mostly tenryō territory under direct control of the Tokugawa shogunate in the Edo period. With the establishment of the modern municipalities system in the early Meiji period in 1889, the area was reorganized into numerous villages within both Haibara and Shida Districts within Shizuoka Prefecture. Kawanehon was formed on September 20, 2005 by the merger of the former towns of Nakakawane and Honkawane, both from Haibara District.

Economy
The economy of Kawanehon is dominated by forestry and the production of green tea, with tourism on the Ōigawa Railway and to hot spring resorts also playing a role.

Education
Kawanehon has four public elementary schools and two public middle schools operated by the town government. The town has one public high school operated by the Shizuoka Prefectural Board of Education.

Transportation

Railway
 - Ōigawa Railway - Ōigawa Main Line
 -  -  -  -  -  -  - 
 - Ōigawa Railway - Ikawa Line
 -  -  -  -  -  -  -  -  -  -  -

Highway

Local attractions
The sound of the steam locomotives of Ōigawa Railway is listed as one of the 100 Soundscapes of Japan by the Ministry of the Environment

References

External links

 

Towns in Shizuoka Prefecture
Kawanehon, Shizuoka